The Battle of Creadran Cille was fought in 1257 between the Gaels of Tír Chonaill, led by Gofraidh Ó Domhnaill, and the Normans, led by Maurice FitzGerald. It took place at Ros Ceide (Rosses Point) in the territory of Cairbre Drom Cliabh, near Sligo town. The forces of Tír Chonaill were victorious and drove the Normans out of their territory.

According to the Annals of the Four Masters (English translation):

A brave battle was fought by Godfrey O'Donnell, Lord of Tirconnell, in defence of his country, with the Lord Justice of Ireland, Maurice Fitzgerald, and the other English nobles of Connaught, at Creadran-Cille in Ros-cede, in the territory of Carbury, to the north of Sligo. A desperate and furious battle was fought between them: bodies were mangled, heroes were disabled, and the senses were stunned on both sides. The field was vigorously maintained by the Kinel-Connell, who made such obstinate and vigorous onsets upon the English that, in the end, they routed them with great slaughter. Godfrey himself, however, was severely wounded; for he met Maurice Fitzgerald face to face in single combat, in which they wounded each other severely. In consequence of the success of this battle, the English and the Geraldines were driven out of Lower Connaught.

M1257.14 On the same day Mac Griffin, an illustrious knight, was taken prisoner by O'Donnell's people; and Sligo was afterwards burned and totally plundered by them. Donough, the son of Cormac O'Donnell, was killed in the heat of this battle of Creadran. They (O'Donnell's people) then returned home in consequence of O'Donnell's wounds; but, were it not that his wounds had oppressed him, he would have routed his enemies to the River Moy. Godfrey, on his return, prostrated and demolished the castle which had been erected by the English a short time before, at Cael-uisce, to carry on the war against the Kinel-Connell.

M1257.15 Maurice Fitzgerald, for some time Lord Justice of Ireland, and the destroyer of the Irish, died.

References

1257 in Ireland
Creadran Cille
Creadran Cille
History of County Sligo
Creadran Cille
FitzGerald dynasty
O'Donnell dynasty